The MDAX is a stock index which lists German companies trading on the Frankfurt Stock Exchange. The index is calculated by Deutsche Börse.

It includes the 50 Prime Standard shares that rank in size immediately below the companies included in the DAX index. The company size is calculated based on a combination of order book volume and market capitalization. The index is based on prices generated in the electronic trading system Xetra.

In 2021, in response to the Wirecard scandal, the number of constituents in the DAX was increased from 30 to 40, while the number of constituents in the MDAX was reduced from 60 to 50.

Companies

The following 50 companies make up the index as of the quarterly review effective on January 15, 2023.

: Source: :de:MDAX.

See also
 DAX
 SDAX
 TecDAX
 ÖkoDAX

References

External links
MDAX

German stock market indices